USS Confederacy was a  36-gun sailing frigate of the Continental Navy in the American Revolutionary War. The British Royal Navy captured her in March 1781. The British named her Confederate but never commissioned her. She reached England in about half-a-year and was broken up in 1782.

Career

She was launched on 8 November 1778 at Chatham (Norwich), Connecticut, and towed to New London to be prepared for sea. From 1 May to 24 August 1779 she cruised on the Atlantic coast under the command of Captain Seth Harding. While convoying a fleet of merchantmen, on 6 June, she and  captured three prizes, drove off two British frigates and brought the convoy safely into Philadelphia, Pennsylvania.

On 17 September 1779 Confederacy was ordered to carry the French Minister and his family back to France. Later John Jay, the first American Minister to Spain, his secretary, and family were added to the passenger list. During the passage on 7 November 1779 Confederacy was completely dismasted and almost lost, but managed through the skillful seamanship of Captain Harding to reach Martinique early in December. After repairs, she returned to convoy duty.

Captain Nicholson replaced Harding in on 20 October 1780.

The British ships forced Confederacy to strike her flag. Most of the merchantmen she was escorting escaped. Many of her crew were sent to the old prison hulk , though some ended up in Mill and Forton prisons.

Fate

The Royal Navy sent her to England, under the command of Captain James Cumming. He paid her off in September 1781. She was never commissioned and was docked on 18 November 1781 at Woolwich. She was broken up there in March 1782.

See also

 List of sailing frigates of the United States Navy
 Bibliography of early American naval history

Citations and references
Citations

References

External links
 The Frigate Confederacy Papers, including correspondence, bills, receipts and other materials pertaining to the construction of USS Confederacy, are available for research use at the Historical Society of Pennsylvania.

Ships of the Continental Navy
Ships built in Norwich, Connecticut
1778 ships
Captured ships
Fifth-rate frigates of the Royal Navy
Sailing frigates of the United States Navy